The 1991 Iowa State Cyclones football team represented Iowa State University during the 1991 NCAA Division I-A football season.  They played their home games at Cyclone Stadium in Ames, Iowa. They participated as members of the Big Eight Conference.  The team was coached by head coach Jim Walden.

Schedule

Personnel

Season summary

Eastern Illinois

Iowa

at Wisconsin

at Rice

Oklahoma

at Kansas

Oklahoma State

at Missouri

Kansas State

at Nebraska

Colorado

References

Iowa State
Iowa State Cyclones football seasons
Iowa State Cyclones football